.ir is the Internet country code top-level domain (ccTLD) for Iran. It is managed by the Institute for Research in Fundamental Sciences.

Second-level domains 
 .ir – public
 .ac.ir – academic (tertiary education and research establishments) and learned societies.
 .co.ir – commercial/companies
 .gov.ir – government (Islamic Republic of Iran)
 .id.ir – personal, one per unique national identity number
 .net.ir – ISPs and network companies approved by the CRA
 .org.ir – non-profit organisations
 .sch.ir – schools, primary and secondary education

Persian domains 
Persian internationalized domain names are available for registration under .ایران.ir for public, in the Persian script.

In 2010,  ICANN approved IRNIC's proposal for the ایران. IDN ccTLD (representing the Persian spelling of Iran), pending the final step of String Delegation.

Testbeds 
 .dnssec.ir – limited term testbed for DNSSEC support

References

External links
 IRNIC Official Website
 IANA .ir whois information
   IRNIC, Dot-IR (.ir) ccTLD Registry
   List of Resellers of IRNIC

Country code top-level domains
Internet in Iran
Mass media in Iran
Council of European National Top Level Domain Registries members
1994 establishments in Iran

sv:Toppdomän#I